Tom McPherson (born March 26, 1935 – December 15, 2020) was an American politician from Florida, serving both as a mayor and in both houses of state government.

McPherson was the first elected mayor of Cooper City, Florida, United States, with prior mayors being appointed by property developers. He was born in Decatur, Illinois.  He later served in both houses of government in Florida for over 16 years.

During his time in the legislature, McPherson championed environmental issues, including raising over $100 million via bonds to protect environmentally sensitive areas. He also served as the House Community Affairs Committee chairman.

McPherson lost his state Senate seat in 1990 after losing in the primary to Ken Jenne. McPherson lost the seat a year after admitting his drinking problem on the floor of the state Senate.

On December 15, 2020, McPherson died in Tallahassee, Florida.

References

Living people
Mayors of places in Florida
Florida state senators
People from Cooper City, Florida
1935 births